Mike Renaud (born May 25, 1983) is a former professional Canadian football punter for the Winnipeg Blue Bombers of the Canadian Football League. He was signed by the Montreal Alouettes as an undrafted free agent in 2006. He played CIS Football at Concordia.

Renaud has also been a member of the Mönchengladbach Mavericks, Team Ohio, and the Calgary Stampeders.

Professional career
In February 2009, he signed as free agent with the Calgary Stampeders, but was then traded to the Winnipeg Blue Bombers on June 13, 2009. Within 2 years, Renaud had already achieved All-Star status as the Eastern Division's All-Star Punter in 2010.

Renaud announced his retirement from professional sports on Feb. 5, 2015.

Post-Career
Renaud, who has made his off-season home in Winnipeg, will continue to reside in Winnipeg and work for a local company.

References

External links
Winnipeg Blue Bombers bio 
Calgary Stampeders bio

1983 births
Living people
American football defensive tackles
Calgary Stampeders players
Canadian football defensive linemen
Concordia Stingers football players
Montreal Alouettes players
Canadian football people from Ottawa
Players of Canadian football from Ontario
Winnipeg Blue Bombers players